The Infinitive of Go is a 1980 science fiction novel by British writer John Brunner.

Synopsis
The novel revolves around a teleportation technology which is being developed. The first test is an abject failure. Faced with termination of the project, Dr. Justin Williams, the inventor of the technology, performs the next test himself. He finds himself in a world which is subtly different from his own. It is revealed that when humans are "Posted" (transported), their inner desires influence the outcome, tipping them into alternate universes. 

When Dr. Eduardo Landini is Posted back following a mechanical accident, the being who emerges is a humanoid descended from baboons, who claims to be Ed Landini. Rumors about his appearance inspire revulsion among staff members at the facility, and as those rumours spread into the general population, others begin exploiting the fears generated for their own purposes. Landini himself has no stomach for the attention, and openly shows his contempt for the behaviour of the humans around him.

Reception
Greg Costikyan reviewed The Infinitive of Go in Ares Magazine #2 and commented that "The story is well written, as one has come to expect from John Brunner, and his plot is engaging."

Reviews
Review by John Hobson (1982) in Paperback Inferno, Volume 5, Number 6
Review [German] by Harald Pusch (1983) in Science Fiction Times, Juli 1983

References

External links

Review

1980 British novels
1980 science fiction novels
Novels by John Brunner
Del Rey books